The Ulukent mine is a large mine in the west of Turkey in Denizli Province  west of the capital, Ankara. Ulukent represents the largest manganese reserve in Turkey having estimated reserves of 2.5 million tonnes of manganese.

References

External links
Official site

Manganese mines in Turkey
Buildings and structures in Denizli Province
Geography of Denizli Province